Mack Walker (June 6, 1929 – February 10, 2021) was an American historian of German intellectual history.

Life and career
Born near Springfield, Massachusetts, in 1929, he began teaching German history in the 1950s, and had an interest in German intellectual history of the late 17th and early 18th centuries. Walker began teaching at Johns Hopkins University in 1974 and retired in June 1999.  He published several books on German history, including the influential German Home Towns (1971), in which he examined the nature of small-town life in Early Modern Germany.  He was a recipient of a Guggenheim Fellowship and awards from the National Endowment for the Humanities.

Walker died from COVID-19 on February 10, 2021, aged 91.

Principle publications
German Home Towns: Community, State and General Estate 1648–1871.  Cornell University Press; Reprint edition (June 18, 1998). 
The Salzburg Transaction: Expulsion and Redemption in Eighteenth Century Germany. Cornell University Press; 1 edition (1992). 
Johann Jakob Moser and the Holy Roman Empire of the German Nation. The University of North Carolina Press; 1 edition (January 1, 1981).  
Germany and the Emigration, 1816–1885. Harvard University Press; 1 edition (1964).

References

1929 births
2021 deaths
Bowdoin College alumni
Johns Hopkins University
21st-century American historians
21st-century American male writers
Historians of Germany
People from Springfield, Massachusetts
Place of death missing
Deaths from the COVID-19 pandemic in Maryland
American male non-fiction writers